The Northern Counties Paladin, also badged as the Plaxton Paladin towards the end of production, is a step-entrance single-decker bus body built by Northern Counties of Wigan, UK, between 1991 and 1998. The replacements for the Paladin are the Prestige and the Pointer as low-floor models for the Paladin LF.

The Paladin was built on several different chassis types:

 Volvo B10M
 Volvo B10B
 Volvo B6
 Dennis Dart
 Dennis Lance
 Dennis Falcon
 Scania L113
 DAF SB220
 Leyland Atlantean (rebodies)

Three different shapes of windscreen were fitted to Paladins. One was of gentle "barrel shaped" curvature, with deep quarterlights. This was used throughout the production run, being fitted to both the earliest vehicles and to the last batches built. An upright "wrap-around" screen was used on the majority of midi-sized Paladin bodies (on Dennis Dart and Volvo B6 chassis), whilst a double-curvature screen was fitted to some Scania L113 and DAF SB220 full-sized vehicles.

Some bodies built towards the end of production were given Plaxton body numbers, in which the Paladin was identified by the letter G.

See also
 List of buses

References

External links



Paladin
Midibuses
Step-entrance buses
Vehicles introduced in 1991